The men's 4 × 400 metres relay event at the 2021 European Athletics Indoor Championships was held on 7 March 2021 at 18:57 (final) local time.

Records

Medalists

Results

References

2021 European Athletics Indoor Championships
4 × 400 metres relay at the European Athletics Indoor Championships